Kasper Enghardt Pedersen (born 27 May 1992) is a Danish professional footballer who plays as a centre-back for Danish 1st Division club FC Helsingør.

A versatile defender, Enghardt captained FC Helsingør to promotion from the Danish third tier to second tier, before being signed by Superliga club Randers FC. After three years in Randers, he moved to Lyngby Boldklub.

Career

Helsingør
Enghardt came to Danish third tier club FC Helsingør, then named Elite 3000, in 2011 after coming through the ranks in the academy of AB. After establishing himself as a regular starter in defense, he signed a one-year contract extension in June 2013. The following season, Enghardt was appointed as club captain at only 21 years of age, and signed a one-and-a-half year contract extension in March 2014.

Enghardt captained FC Helsingør to promotion to the Danish second tier during the 2014–15 season, with the club finishing first in the Eastern division. Preparing for the new season in a higher division, Helsingør extended Enghardt's contract another two years.

Randers
On 1 June 2016, Danish Superliga club Randers FC announced the signing of Enghardt, with the player announced to sign a three-year contract with the club. The transfer was called the largest sale in FC Helsingør history by their chairman Janus Kyhl.

On 12 August, Enghardt made his competitive debut for Randers, coming on as a 90th-minute substitute for Kasper Fisker in a 1–0 away win over Viborg FF. After regular centre-backs Mads Fenger and Mads Agesen suffered injuries during the fall, Enghardt, who had mostly played holding midfielder in his career, stepped in and played centre-back. He afterwards became a full-time starter for Randers in the heart of defense after the departure of Fenger in June 2017. Enghardt made 34 total appearances in his first season in the Superliga, scoring one goal.

After three seasons in Randers, Enghardt announced in January 2019 that he would leave Randers FC when his contract expired, citing a desire to try something new. He ended his tenure for the club with 90 total appearances in which he scored three goals.

Lyngby
On 4 July 2019, Enghardt joined newly promoted Superliga club Lyngby Boldklub. He made his competitive debut for Lyngby on 14 July as a starter in a 2–0 home win over AaB. During his time at the club, he grew out to become team captain.

Return to Helsingør
On 12 June 2021, after Lyngby suffered relegation to the second tier, Enghardt signed a three-year contract with his former club Helsingør, also competing in the second tier. After signing, he stated that his ambition was to lead the club back to the Danish Superliga.

Personal life
In 2016, while playing on a semi-professional contract for Helsingør, Enghardt graduated as Bachelor of Engineering and was appointed as enterprise resource planner for the construction of the Copenhagen Metro. He was responsible for overseeing the connection between Frederiksberg and Enghave Plads. After signing a fully professional contract with Randers FC, he resigned from the job.

Notes

References

External links

1992 births
Living people
People from Gladsaxe Municipality
Danish men's footballers
Danish 1st Division players
Danish Superliga players
Akademisk Boldklub players
FC Helsingør players
Randers FC players
Lyngby Boldklub players
Association football defenders
Sportspeople from the Capital Region of Denmark